Joseph Cerne (born April 26, 1942) is a former professional American football center in the  National Football League (NFL). He played four seasons for the San Francisco 49ers and the Atlanta Falcons. He is the first Slovene to play in the NFL.
He was also called the best player in the league at his position.

References

1942 births
Living people
American football centers
Atlanta Falcons players
Northwestern Wildcats football players
San Francisco 49ers players
People from Črnomelj
Players of American football from Wisconsin
Sportspeople from Kenosha, Wisconsin